Sharren Haskel (born 4 March 1984) is an Israeli politician. She is a member of the Knesset for the National Unity Party, having previously served as a member of Likud and for New Hope. When she was first elected, she was the youngest member of Likud and the second youngest member of the 20th Knesset.

Biography
Sharren Haskel was born in Toronto, Ontario, Canada, to a Jewish family, the middle of three sisters. Her father, Amir, was born in Israel, and is from a family of Palmach veterans from moshav Tzofit. Her mother, Fabienne, was born in Morocco. Amir and Fabienne met in Paris and moved to Toronto, after Fabienne received a job offer as an English teacher. Her family moved to Israel a year after her birth. She was raised in Kfar Saba and studied theatre at Katznelson high school, where she was a leader in scouts, and later transferred to Ankori high school, where she studied Cinema. At the age of 18, Haskel enlisted in the Israel Border Police. According to Haskel, the Second Intifada, during which she served in the Border Police operating checkpoints and attending home demolitions and demonstrations, narrowly escaped two suicide bombings on Israeli buses, and lost two friends to terrorist attacks, helped shape her ideology.

After being discharged from the Border Police, Haskel studied for a year in the United States, and then lived in Australia for six years. She graduated from AVT Australia's program for veterinary nursing.
Haskel completed her bachelor's degree in political science and  international relations at the Open University of Israel, where she was active in the debate team. In 2014, Haskel won the Israeli National Champion Debate for Juniors. She is also an alumnus of the Jewish Statesmanship Center in Public Policy.

She speaks English, Hebrew, and French.

Social activism
Haskel lived in Australia for six years where she worked as a veterinary nurse in Bondi Vet animal hospital, and volunteered most of her time to WIRES, an organization that rescue wild animals, treat them and release them back into the wild.

She is active on environmental and animal rights issues, with a particular focus on water pollution coming out of areas under the control of the Palestinian Authority. 
Haskel supports de-criminalization of cannabis, and is an advocate for medical cannabis usage.

Political career
In 2013, Haskel attempted to win a council seat in Kfar Saba's local election. Although she lost, she continued to volunteer her time as an activist in the environmental committee at Kfar Saba city hall.

Prior to the 2015 Knesset elections she was placed 31st on the Likud list. Although she failed to enter the Knesset when Likud won 30 seats, she became an MK in 2015 as a replacement for Danny Danon following his appointment as Israel's envoy to the United Nations on 14 August 2015.

Haskel heads the LGBT Knesset caucus, yet in 2016 she voted against the bills purporting to advance gay rights, proposed by Zionist Union and Yesh Atid: recognition of a bereaved widower in same sex couples, a bill banning conversion therapy attempting to convert gays to heterosexuals, a bill to recognize a same-sex marriage contract and a bill to train health professionals to deal with gender and sexual inclination issues.

On 15 December 2019, Haskel endorsed Gideon Sa'ar in the primary for Likud party leadership. On 23 December 2020 she announced that she would join Sa'ar's new party, New Hope. She was placed fifth on the New Hope list for the March 2021 elections and was again elected to the Knesset as New Hope won six seats.

In the elections to the twenty-fifth Knesset, she was placed 11th in the "state camp" list, the list received 12 mandates and was thus sworn into the Knesset for the fifth time.

A classical liberal,  Haskel is a spirited supporter of free markets and civil liberties. She was the legislature's primary proponent of cannabis legalization.

Awards and recognition
Sharren Haskel received high scores in 2016 and 2017 from the annual "Liberty Index", rating Members of Knesset based on how their legislative activity promotes or suppresses personal freedom and free markets, which is compiled by the New Liberal Movement (described by one of its founders as "much like the better goals of the Tea Party in the United States.") In May 2016 Haskel was recognized by the Jewish Journal in the United States as a leader of new generation of women in politics, mainly for her extensive work around the world to defend Israel’s policy and government.

Committee assignments
Haskel served on these committees for the 20th Knesset:
Foreign Affairs and Defense Committee
Special committee for internal and environmental affairs
Special Committee on Drugs and Alcohol Abuse
Science and Technology Committee

Personal
She is married, and in 2020 she gave birth to her first child. In 2022, she gave birth to twin girls.

See also
Women in Israel

References

External links
 

1984 births
Living people
21st-century Israeli women politicians
Canadian emigrants to Israel
Canadian Jews
Canadian people of Israeli descent
Canadian people of Moroccan-Jewish descent
Israeli Jews
Israeli people of Canadian-Jewish descent
Israeli people of Moroccan-Jewish descent
Jewish Israeli politicians
Likud politicians
Members of the 20th Knesset (2015–2019)
Members of the 21st Knesset (2019)
Members of the 22nd Knesset (2019–2020)
Members of the 23rd Knesset (2020–2021)
Members of the 24th Knesset (2021–2022)
Members of the 25th Knesset (2022–)
New Hope (Israel) politicians
Open University of Israel alumni
People from Kfar Saba
Politicians from Toronto
Women members of the Knesset
Women veterinarians
Jewish women politicians